Filip Roman Kaczyński (born 1987) is a Polish politician and local government official who was a Member of Parliament (Sejm) in 2015, having filled a position vacated by Krzysztof Szczerski. He presently serves in the Lesser Poland Regional Assembly. He is part of the Law and Justice Party.

References

External links
 VII kadencja

1987 births
Members of the Polish Sejm 2011–2015
Members of the Polish Sejm 2019–2023
Living people